= Hallie Prescott =

American sepsis researcher

Hallie C. Prescott is the Toews Family Legacy Professor of Internal Medicine at the University of Michigan, where she researches sepsis.

== Education ==
Prescott received her M.D. from The Ohio State University and completed her residency and fellowship training in internal medicine and pulmonary and critical care medicine at the University of Michigan.

== Career ==
Prescott served as co-chair and lead author of the 2026 Surviving Sepsis Campaign International Guidelines. She has published research on adult and pediatric intensive care practices, hospital-acquired infections and antimicrobial prescribing patterns, and inhaler device-related treatment outcomes.

In 2025, she was awarded the University of Michigan Institute for Healthcare Policy & Innovation policy impact award for her research into sepsis care.
